Durrell La Faunce Summers (born April 2, 1990) is an American professional basketball player for Mineros de Zacatecas of the Liga Nacional de Baloncesto Profesional (LNBP). He played college basketball for Michigan State University.

High school career
Summers attended Redford Covenant Christian High School and averaged 34.5 points, 16.5 rebounds and 4.0 steals per game as a senior. He led Redford Covenant to a 20–5 record and a spot in the Class D regional finals where they lost to Jackson Christian High School.  In addition, Summers was the 2007 Detroit News All-State Dream Team selection and Associated Press Class D Player of the Year.

College career
Summers played four years with the Michigan State Spartans from 2007 to 2011.  As a junior during the 2009–10 season, Summers averaged 11.3 points per game on 45.5% shooting from the field in 26.2 minutes per game.  Durrell's college career high of 26 points happened in Columbus, Ohio on January 25, 2009 against the Ohio State Buckeyes. Durrell shot 8/13 from the field, with 4/4 free throws, and was 6/9 from three point range.

Summers postponed entering the NBA draft after his junior year and stayed with the Spartans for a senior year. Tom Izzo's returning class with Summers and Kalin Lucas in addition to the incoming freshman class, had high expectations for the 2010–11 season. The Spartans were ranked #2 in the AP basketball polls. During Summer's senior season, he averaged 11.6 points per game while shooting 38.7% from the field in 29 minutes per game. Summers majored in Sociology.

Professional career
In November 2011, Summers was drafted in the second round of the NBA Development League draft by the Maine Red Claws. A month later, he was signed by the Charlotte Bobcats. He recorded two points and one rebound in 10 minutes in two preseason games but was subsequently waived before the start of the 2011–12 season. He then returned to Maine. In January 2012, he left Maine and signed with S.O.M. Boulonnais of France but left in February after three games.

On November 2, 2012, Summers was drafted in the fourth round of the NBA Development League draft by the Santa Cruz Warriors. Three days later, he was traded to the Idaho Stampede.

In May 2013, Summers joined Trotamundos de Carabobo of the Liga Profesional de Baloncesto.

On September 13, 2013, Summers signed with the Wollongong Hawks of the Australian NBL. However, due to personal circumstances, on October 3, he was released by the Hawks. Later that month, he joined Atomerőmű SE of Hungary. After three games, he was released and in November 2013, joined BC Körmend. He was then released by Körmend after just one game. In December 2013, he signed with Ironi Kiryat Ata of Israel where he played six games before being released in February 2014.

On October 24, 2014, Summers' D-League rights were traded by the Idaho Stampede to the Reno Bighorns. He officially joined Reno on November 2, 2014. On February 5, 2015, he was waived by the Bighorns. On February 13, he was acquired by the Westchester Knicks. In April 2015, following the conclusion of the 2014–15 D-League season, he signed with Rayos de Hermosillo of Mexico for the rest of the 2015 CIBACOPA season.

On November 2, 2015, Summers was reacquired by Westchester, only to be waived by the team five days later. On November 14, he signed with Deportivo Valdivia of the Liga Nacional de Básquetbol de Chile. On May 21, 2016, he left Valdivia and signed with Frayles de Guasave of the CIBACOPA. He later re-joined Valdivia for the 2016–17 season. In March 2017, he signed with Club Olimpo of the Torneo Nacional de Ascenso (second division of the Argentine basketball). On December 2, 2017, Summers scored a career-high 56 points to go along with 12 rebounds in a 96-97 loss to the Colegio Los Leones.

For the 2019–20 season, Summers was acquired by the Hornets' NBA G League affiliate, the Greensboro Swarm. However, he never played for the team. Summers spent the 2019-20 season with CEB Puerto Montt of the Liga Nacional de Básquetbol de Chile. He averaged 30.8 points, 5.7 rebounds, 2.9 assists and 1.0 steal per game. On October 2, 2020, Summers signed with Dorados de Chihuahua of the Mexican Liga Nacional de Baloncesto Profesional.

In May 2020, Summers signed with Team Detroit in The Basketball Tournament.

References

External links
Michigan State Spartans bio
NBA D-League profile
Eurobasket.com profile

1989 births
Living people
American expatriate basketball people in Argentina
American expatriate basketball people in Australia
American expatriate basketball people in Chile
American expatriate basketball people in France
American expatriate basketball people in Germany
American expatriate basketball people in Hungary
American expatriate basketball people in Israel
American expatriate basketball people in Mexico
American expatriate basketball people in Venezuela
American men's basketball players
Atomerőmű SE players
Basketball players from Detroit
BC Körmend players
Dorados de Chihuahua (LNBP) players
Eisbären Bremerhaven players
Estudiantes de Bahía Blanca basketball players
Frayles de Guasave players
Idaho Stampede players
Maine Red Claws players
Michigan State Spartans men's basketball players
Mineros de Zacatecas (basketball) players
Olimpo basketball players
Parade High School All-Americans (boys' basketball)
Rayos de Hermosillo players
Reno Bighorns players
Ironi Kiryat Ata players
Shooting guards
SOMB Boulogne-sur-Mer players
Trotamundos B.B.C. players
Westchester Knicks players